Saint-Malo-de-Phily is a commune in the Ille-et-Vilaine department in Brittany in northwestern France. It is about 25 km south of Rennes.

Population

See also
Communes of the Ille-et-Vilaine department

References

External links

Mayors of Ille-et-Vilaine Association 

Communes of Ille-et-Vilaine